The Piri Reis map is a world map compiled in 1513 by the Ottoman admiral and cartographer Piri Reis. Approximately one third of the map survives; it shows the western coasts of Europe and North Africa and the coast of Brazil with reasonable accuracy. Various Atlantic islands, including the Azores and Canary Islands, are depicted, as is the mythical island of Antillia and possibly Japan.

The map's historical importance lies in its demonstration of the extent of exploration of the New World by approximately 1510, and in its claim to have used a map made by Christopher Columbus, otherwise lost, as a source. Piri also stated that he had used ten Arab sources and four Indian maps sourced from the Portuguese. More recently, the map has been the focus of claims for the pre-modern exploration of the Antarctic coast.

The Piri Reis map is in the Library of the Topkapı Palace in Istanbul, Turkey, but is not usually on public display.

Description
The map is the extant western third of a world map drawn on gazelle-skin parchment approximately 87 cm × 63 cm. The surviving portion primarily details the western coast of Africa and the eastern coast of South America. The map was signed by Piri Reis, an Ottoman-Turkish admiral, geographer and cartographer, and dated to the month of Muharram in the Islamic year 919 AH, equivalent to 1513 AD. It was presented to Ottoman Sultan Selim I in 1517. In the map's legend, Piri inscribed that the map was based on about twenty charts and mappae mundi. According to Piri, these maps included eight Ptolemaic maps, an Arabic map of India, four newly drawn Portuguese maps from Sindh, and a map by Christopher Columbus of the western lands. From Inscription 6 on the map:
From eight Jaferyas of that kind and one Arabic map of Hind [India], and from four newly drawn Portuguese maps which show the countries of Sind [now in modern day Pakistan], Hind and Çin [China] geometrically drawn, and also from a map drawn by Qulūnbū [Columbus] in the western region, I have extracted it. By reducing all these maps to one scale this final form was arrived at, so that this map of these lands is regarded by seamen as accurate and as reliable as the accuracy and reliability of the Seven Seas on the aforesaid maps."

There is some scholarly debate over whether the 20 charts and mappae mundi in Piri's inscriptions includes the eight Ptolemaic maps, the four Portuguese maps, the Arabic map and the Columbus map. From one perspective, the number of charts and mappae mundi used by Piri equals 20, while in the other, it could mean a total of 34. Some have claimed that the source maps were found in the ancient Library of Alexandria, based on Piri's allusions to Alexander the Great, the founder of Alexandria, Ptolemy I, who ruled Alexandria in the 4th century BC, and Claudius Ptolemy, the Greek geographer and cartographer who lived in Alexandria during the 2nd century AD. Gregory McIntosh states "Arab writers often confused Claudius Ptolemy, the geographer of the second century C.E., with Ptolemy I, one of Alexander's generals... Piri Reis has undoubtedly made the same error, resulting in his believing the charts and maps were from the time of Ptolemy I instead of Claudius Ptolemy."

History
The map was discovered serendipitously on 9 October 1929, through the philological work of the German theologian Gustav Adolf Deissmann (1866–1937). He had been commissioned by the Turkish Ministry of Education to catalogue the Topkapı Palace library's non-Islamic items. At Deissmann's request to search the palace for old maps and charts, the director Halil Edhem (1861–1938) managed to find some disregarded bundles of material, which he handed over to Deissmann.  Realizing that the map might be a unique find, Deissmann showed it to the orientalist Paul Kahle, who identified it as a map drawn by Piri Reis. The discovery caused an international sensation, as it represented the only then known copy of a world map of Christopher Columbus (1451–1506), and was the only 16th-century map that showed South America in its proper longitudinal position in relation to Africa. Geographers had spent several centuries unsuccessfully searching for a "lost map of Columbus" that was supposedly drawn while he was in the West Indies.

After reading about the map's discovery in The Illustrated London News, United States Secretary of State Henry L. Stimson contacted the United States Ambassador to Turkey Charles H. Sherrill and requested that an investigation be launched to find the Columbus source map, which he believed might have been in Turkey. In turn, the Turkish government complied with Stimson's request, but they were unsuccessful in locating any of the source maps.

The map was depicted on the reverse of the Turkish 10 million lira banknote of 1999–2005, and of the new 10 lira banknote of 2005–2009.

Analysis
The map is a portolan chart, as shown by the four compass roses (two large and two small) from which lines of bearing radiate. Some analyses assert that the map is an azimuthal equidistant projection centered on Cairo, but a 1998 analysis by Steven Dutch of the University of Wisconsin Green Bay shows a better fit with a point near the intersection of the present-day prime meridian and the equator. There are extensive notes in Ottoman Turkish around the edges of the map, as well as some interior detail which is mostly inaccurate and fanciful.

The accuracy of the Piri Reis map is mixed. The Iberian peninsula and the coast of Africa, well known to cartographers of the time, are depicted accurately. The Azores, Canary Islands and Cape Verde Islands are portrayed more or less accurately but not drawn to proper scale. The northern portion of the South American coast is also rendered fairly accurately and positioned correctly across from Africa. Much of the Caribbean also is mapped fairly accurately, perhaps reflecting Christopher Columbus's recent maps of the region. The area representing North America bears little resemblance to the actual coastline except for one projection which might portray Newfoundland. An island nearby labeled "Antilia" might be Nova Scotia since a note there refers to the legendary voyages of Saint Brendan. Greenland is not shown on the map.

Although there are frequent claims of the Piri Reis map's extreme accuracy, McIntosh, in comparing it to several other portolan-style maps of the era, found that:
The Piri Reis map is not the most accurate map of the sixteenth century, as has been claimed, there being many, many world maps produced in the remaining eighty-seven years of that century that far surpass it in accuracy. The Ribeiro maps of the 1520s and 1530s, the Ortelius map of 1570, and the Wright-Molyneux map of 1599 ('the best map of the sixteenth century') are only a few better-known examples.

However, Piri Reis map was compiled in 1513 and predates all the maps listed above.

Piri Reis shared Duarte Pacheco Pereira’s concept of the Ocean being surrounded by the continents. An inscription in the Atlantic on the map says that it had been thought to have no limits and that its other side was darkness but that since the voyages of Columbus and of the Portuguese to India it was realized that it was surrounded by coasts, like a lake.

The Antarctic coast
There are two major discrepancies from known coastlines: the North American coast mentioned above, and the southern portion of the South American coast. On the Piri Reis map, the latter is shown bending off sharply to the east starting around present-day Rio de Janeiro. Another interpretation of this territory has been to identify this section with the Queen Maud Land coast of Antarctica. This claim is generally traced to Arlington H. Mallery, a civil engineer and amateur archaeologist who was a supporter of pre-Columbian trans-oceanic contact hypotheses. Though his assertions were not well received by scholars, they were revived in Charles Hapgood's 1966 book Maps of the Ancient Sea Kings. This book proposed a theory of global exploration by a pre-classical undiscovered civilisation based on his analysis of this and other ancient and late-medieval maps. More notoriously, these claims were repeated in Erich von Däniken's Chariots of the Gods? (which attributed the knowledge of the coast to extraterrestrials) and Gavin Menzies's 1421: The Year China Discovered the World (which attributed it to supposed Chinese voyages), both of which were roundly denounced by mainstream scholars.

An analysis of these claims was published by Gregory McIntosh, a historian of cartography, who examined the map in depth in his book The Piri Reis Map of 1513 (Athens and London: University of Georgia Press, 2000). He was able to find sources for much of the map in Columbus's writings. Certain peculiarities (such as the appearance of the Virgin Islands in two locations) he attributed to the use of multiple maps as sources; others (such as the errors in North American geography) he traced to the continued confusion of the area with East Asia. As far as the accuracy of depiction of the supposed Antarctic coast is concerned, there are two conspicuous errors. First, it is shown hundreds of kilometres north of its proper location; second, the Drake Passage is completely missing, with the Antarctic Peninsula presumably conflated with the Western Patagonian coast. The identification of this area of the map with the frigid Antarctic coast is also difficult to reconcile with the notes on the map which describe the region as having a warm climate.

Maps of the period generally depicted a large continent named Terra Australis Incognita of highly variable shape and extent. This land was posited by Ptolemy as a counterbalance to the extensive continental areas in the northern hemisphere. Marcus Tullius Cicero used the term cingulus australis ("southern zone") in referring to the Antipodes in Somnium Scipionis ("Dream of Scipio"). Due to a lack of exploration and various misunderstandings, its existence was not fully abandoned until circumnavigation of the area during the second voyage of James Cook in the 1770s showed that if it existed, it was much smaller than imagined previously. The first confirmed landing on Antarctica was only during the First Russian Antarctic Expedition in 1820, and the coastline of Queen Maud Land did not see significant exploration before Norwegian expeditions began in 1891. In 1513, Cape Horn had not yet been discovered, and indeed Ferdinand Magellan's voyage of circumnavigation was not to set sail for another six years. It is unclear whether the mapmaker saw South America itself as part of the unknown southern lands (as shown in the Miller Atlas), or whether (as Dutch thought) he drew what was then known of the coast with substantial distortion. Dutch holds that there is no reason to believe that the map is the product of genuine knowledge of the Antarctic coast.

See also
Geography in medieval Islam
Ancient world maps
World map
Waldseemüller map
Johannes Schöner globes, made in 1515 and 1520. Also shows a Southern Continent at the South Pole.

Notes

References
 .
 .
 .
 .
 .
 .
 .
 .
 .
 .
 .
 .

 .
 .
 .

 .

External links
Turkey in Maps: The Piri Reis margin notes, translation from The Oldest Map of America (Afet Inan, Ankara, 1954).
Charles Hapgood commentary on the Piri Reis map, photocopied from Maps of the Ancient Sea Kings
Steven Dutch, University of Wisconsin: debunking Piri Reis pseudo-scholarship
Sacred Text Archive: pseudo-scholarship about an Ice Age civilization, translation of the map commentary.
"Piri Reis and the Columbian Theory" by Paul Lunde:  text from Aramco World Magazine (Jan-Feb 1980). Citat: "...There may, in fact, be an even simpler explanation of the presence of "Antarctica" on the Piri Reis map..."
Fingerprints of the Gods (2001)  text. Citat: "...William Miller wrote:...The examinations that I have made of it show all sorts of errors that certainly falsify any claim of unusual accuracy for this map..."
The Mysterious Origins of Man: The Oronteus Finaeus Map of 1532, by Paul Heinrich: the Oronteus map and Creationism
 Piri Reis Map: Explained and Elaborated: by Batuhan Aksu. The transliteration and translation of all texts on the map into Turkish and English (suggested by Gregory C. McIntosh).
The Mysteries of the Piri Reis Map: by Diego Cuoghi. On the Piri Reis, Oronteus, and Philippe Buache maps; comparison to other 16th-century maps of America and Asia, debunking the Antarctica claims.
Ottoman-Turkish Historical Maps: includes a large (1 MB) but low-resolution image of the Piri Reis map (not as clear as Wikipedia's image)
The Piri Reis Map by Steven Dutch, Natural and Applied Sciences, University of Wisconsin - Green Bay

Historic maps of the world
1513 works
Piri Reis
Geographical works of the medieval Islamic world
Topkapı Palace
16th-century maps and globes